A House Is Not A Home (家變) is a TVB television series, premiered on 1 August 1977. It is a very successful classic series boasting the likes of stars Liza Wang, Simon Yam, Ha Yu and also veteran actors like Bak Man-biu, Tang Pik-wan and Lee Heung-kam. The show became a 1970s drama classic, well-known also for its theme song, "A House Is Not A Home"; 家變, which was composed/arranged by Joseph Koo with lyrics by the late Wong Jim, and sung by Roman Tam.

The Synopsis
In 1970s Hong Kong, the construction industry was booming, but hidden dangers, due to corruption often jeopardized the public's safety. Lok Fai (Bak Man-biu) is one of these construction company owners. He has two wives, the first, Yuen Heng Wan (Tang Pik-wan) has 3 children including a gay son, Lok Wah (Simon Yam). Lok Fai's second wife Wong Yee Tak (Nam Hung) has two daughters, Lok Lam (Liza Wang) and Lok Man (Tsui Mei-leng).

Between the two families, sandwiches Lok's friend a banker and his lawyer son who helps to mediate between the two wives but Heng Wan and her best friend, Sze Li Mo-Yung (Lee Heung-Kam), have deep hatred for them. Lok Lam creates a magazine, but the magazine's publication has Lok Wah's nude photos! (based on the 1970s standard, it is) This causes a war among the two families, and all hell breaks loose....with the anti-corruption ICAC investigators (played by Chow Yun-fat and Bill Chan respectively) who are hot on Lok Fai's trail. With his unworthy son-in-law Ma Chun Yau (Ha Yu) taking over the business it is now up to Lok Lam to save the family business.

Success
The series was hugely successful after its broadcast and established Liza Wang's status in TVB with her portrayal of Lok Lam, the heroine of the story. The ensemble cast (including Tang Pik-wan and Pak Man-biu) helped make the series a success. Liza herself sang her own version of the theme song.

References 

1970s Hong Kong television series
1977 Hong Kong television series debuts
1977 Hong Kong television series endings
TVB dramas
Cantonese-language television shows